The R81 is a provincial route in Limpopo, South Africa that connects Polokwane with the R524 at Nyavani via Giyani.

Route 
The R81 starts at a junction with the R71 Road in Polokwane (capital of the Limpopo Province), in the suburb of Fauna Park (just east of the town centre). It heads north-east as Munnik Avenue to form an interchange with the Polokwane Eastern Bypass (N1 National Route) adjacent to the Mall of the North before exiting the city.

From the N1 interchange, the R81 heads north-east for 71 kilometres to reach a junction with the R36 Road north-west of Modjadjiskloof. The R36 joins the R81 and they are one road eastwards for 1.5 kilometres before the R81 becomes its own road north-east.

From the junction with the R36 near Modjadjiskloof, the R81 goes north-east for 70 kilometres, bypassing the Mooketsi Baobab, to enter the town of Giyani. It meets the eastern terminus of the R578 Road and the northern terminus of the R529 Road before turning northwards to cross the Klein Letaba River into the town centre of Giyani.

From Giyani, the R81 goes north for 47 kilometres, through Malamulele, to end at a junction with the R524 Road at Nyavani.

References

External links
 Routes Travel Info

81
Provincial routes in South Africa